Helminthostachys zeylanica is a terrestrial, herbaceous fern of southeastern Asia and Australia, commonly known as kamraj and tunjuk-langit. The species is like the other members of its family, it has clusters of sporangia on stems of fertile, spike-like fronds.

The rhizome of this annual plant is short, creeping, underground, and stout. They can bear either a solitary frond or several fronds. Leaves are lanceolate with the margins entire or irregularly serrate.

The frond spike arises from the base of the leaves with its own stipe. Below the spike is a sterile leafy segment (the trophophore). Both it and the sporophore arise from a common petiole.

Uses
The roots of this plant are a popular medicine in China, where they are known as "Di wu gong". The roots are harvested during the wet season in July–August. Only wild plants are harvested. In Malaysia, the leaves are dried and smoked to treat bleeding nose. The plant is eaten as a vegetable and used medicinally for impotence in India. It is known in the Philippines as túkod-langit.

Taxonomy
Linnaeus was the first to describe this species with the binomial Osmunda zeylanica in his Species Plantarum of 1753.

References

 Helminthostachys zeylanica - photos and info

Ophioglossaceae
Ferns of Asia
Flora of Asia
Plants described in 1753
Taxa named by Carl Linnaeus
no:Helminthostachys zeylanica